The Dornier 228 is a twin-turboprop STOL utility aircraft, designed and first manufactured by Dornier GmbH (later DASA Dornier, Fairchild-Dornier) from 1981 until 1998. Two hundred and forty-five were built in Oberpfaffenhofen, Germany. In 1983, Hindustan Aeronautics Limited (HAL) bought a production licence and manufactured another 125 aircraft in Kanpur, Uttar Pradesh, India. In July 2017, 63 aircraft were still in airline service.

In 2009, RUAG started building a Dornier 228 New Generation in Germany. The fuselage, wings and tail unit are manufactured by Hindustan Aeronautics Limited (HAL) in Kanpur, India, and transported to Oberpfaffenhofen, where RUAG Aviation carries out aircraft final assembly. The Dornier 228NG use same airframe with improved technologies and performances, such as a new five-blade propeller, glass cockpit and longer range. The first delivery was made in September 2010 to a Japanese operator.
In 2020, RUAG sold the Dornier 228 program to General Atomics.

Development

Origins

In the late 1970s, Dornier GmbH developed a new kind of wing, the TNT (Tragflügel neuer Technologie – Aerofoil new technology), subsidized by the German Government. Dornier tested it on a modified Do 28D-2 Skyservant and with Pratt & Whitney Canada PT6A-110 turboprop engines. Finally, Dornier changed the engine and tested the new aircraft, which was named Dornier 128 with two Garrett AiResearch TPE-331-5 engines. The company developed a new fuselage for the TNT and TPE 331–5 in two variants (15- and 19-passenger) and named both project-aircraft E-1 (later Dornier 228-100) and E-2 (later Dornier 228-200). At the ILA Berlin Air Show in 1980, Dornier presented the new aircraft to the public. Both of the prototypes were flown on 28 March 1981 and 9 May 1981 for the first time.

After German certification was granted on 18 December 1981, the first Dornier 228-100 entered service in the fleet of Norving in July 1982. The first operator of the larger Dornier 228-200 entered service with Jet Charters in late 1982. Certification from both British and American aviation authorities followed on 17 April and 11 May 1984 respectively. By 1983, the production rate of the Dornier 228 had risen to three aircraft per month; at this point, Dornier had targeted that 300 Dornier 228s would be produced by the end of the 1980s. In November 1983, a major license-production and phased technology-transfer agreement between Dornier and Hindustan Aeronautics Limited (HAL) was signed; a separate production line was established and produced its first aircraft in 1985. By 2014, a total of 125 Dornier 228s had been produced in India.

Over the years, Dornier offered the 228 in upgraded variants and fitted with optional equipment for performing various special missions. In 1996, it was announced that all manufacturing operations would be transferred to India. In 1998, activity on the German production line was halted, in part to concentrate on the production of the larger Fairchild-Dornier 328 and in response to Dornier's wider financial difficulties.

Dornier 228NG

In 2002, RUAG took over the Services and Components divisions from Fairchild Dornier, including the Dornier 228 production rights. 
RUAG acquired the Dornier 228 type certificate in 2003. In December 2007, RUAG announced their intention to launch a modernized version of the aircraft, designated as the Dornier 228 Next Generation, or Dornier 228 NG.
At the 2008 Berlin Air Show, HAL agreed on supplying the first three components sets — fuselage, wings and tail — for €5 million, as a part of an €80 million ($123 million) ten-year contract.
In June 2010, the passenger aircraft was priced at €5.2 million ($7 million), €5.8–5.9 million with JAR-Ops equipment; restarting its production cost €20 million.

On 18 August 2010, the Dornier 228NG received its airworthiness certification from the European Aviation Safety Agency (EASA). The final assembly for the type is located in Germany; however, most airframe subassemblies, such as the wings, tail and fuselage, are produced by HAL in India. The main changes from the previous Dornier 228-212 model were a new five-blade propeller made of composite material, more powerful engines and an advanced glass cockpit featuring electronic instrument displays and other avionics improvements.

The first delivery, to the Japanese operator New Central Aviation, took place in September 2010. RUAG decided to suspend production of the Dornier 228 NG after the completion of an initial batch of eight aircraft in 2013. In 2014, RUAG and Tata Group signed an agreement for the latter to become a key supplier of the program. Production was restarted in 2015, with deliveries of four per year planned from 2016. In February 2016, RUAG announced that they were set to begin serial production of the Dornier 228 NG at its German production line in mid-2016; the assembly line is reportedly capable of producing a maximum of 12 aircraft per year.

On 30 September 2020, US firm General Atomics bought the Dornier 228 production line in Oberpfaffenhofen, including the transfer of all 450 employees, pending regulatory approval.
The sale was announced on 15 October 2020, and was completed in February 2021.

Indian production

In late 2017, the Directorate General of Civil Aviation issued a type certificate to the Hindustan 228. The aircraft was so far being manufactured under licence from RUAG for Indian defence forces and European markets would now be allowed to operate in India for commercial purposes. The 228 made its public debut in 2020 at the Dubai Airshow. Alliance Air signed an agreement with Hindustan Aeronautics Limited (HAL) to lease two 17-seater Dornier 228 aircraft in September 2021. The first aircraft was delivered to Alliance Air on 7 April 2022. The HAL Dornier 228 had previously only been used by the Indian Armed Forces but was modified by HAL for commercial operations. Alliance Air deployed the aircraft on a new route connecting Dibrugarh, Assam and Pasighat, Arunachal Pradesh on 12 April 2022, becoming the first airline to use an Indian-made aircraft in civil aviation operations and the first commercial airline in the country to operate the Dornier 228 aircraft.

Hybrid-Electric Demonstrators 

Supported by Bavarian funding, the German DLR is modifying one of its two Dornier 228 into a demonstrator hybrid electric aircraft .
The first fully electric flight is planned for 2020 and the first hybrid-electric flight for 2021, apparently from Cochstedt Airport.
Partners include MTU Aero Engines and Siemens, of which Rolls-Royce plc is acquiring the electric propulsion unit.

On 19 January 2023, ZeroAvia flew its Dornier 228 testbed during 10 minutes with one TPE331 turboprop replaced by a prototype hydrogen-electric powertrain in the cabin: two fuel cells and a lithium-ion battery for peak power, towards a certifiable configuration by 2025.

Design

The Dornier 228 is a twin-engine general purpose aircraft, capable of transporting up to 19 passengers or various cargoes. It is powered by a pair of Garrett TPE331 turboprop engines. The Dornier 228 is commonly classified as a Short Takeoff and Landing (STOL)-capable aircraft, being capable of operating from rough runways and in hot climates. This capability has been largely attributed to the type's supercritical wing which generates large amounts of lift at slow speeds. The Dornier 228 is typically promoted for its versatility, low operational costs, and a high level of reliability – possessing a dispatch reliability of 99%. RUAG Aviation have claimed that no other aircraft in the same class may carry as much cargo or as many passengers over a comparable distance as fast as the Dornier 228 NG.

The rectangular shape of the Dornier 228's fuselage section and large side-loading doors make it particularly suitable for utility operators, which is a market that Dornier had targeted with the type from the onset. According to Flight International, one of the more distinguishing features of the Dornier 228 is the supercritical wing used. The structure of the wing is atypical, consisting of a box formed from four integrally-milled alloy panels. Kevlar is used for the ribs, stringers, trailing edge and fowler flaps, and the wing's leading edge is conventional alloy sheet metal. Benefits of this wing over conventional methodology include a 15% reduction in weight, the elimination of 12,000 rivets, and lowering the per-aircraft manufacturing workload by roughly 340 man hours. Both the fuselage and tail are of a conventional design, but make use of chemical milling in order to save weight.

The Dornier 228 has been promoted in various capacities, including as a commuter aircraft, a military transporter, cargo hauler, or as a special missions aircraft. Special missions include maritime surveillance, border patrol, medevac, search and rescue, paradrop and environmental research missions, in which capacity the type has proven useful due to a ten-hour flight endurance, a wide operating range, low operational cost, and varied equipment range. Special equipment available to be installed include a 360-degree surveillance radar, side-looking airborne radar, forward-looking infrared (FLIR) sensor, search light, operator station, real-time datalink, enlarged fuel tanks, satellite uplink, stretches, air-openable roller door, and infrared/ultraviolet sensors. In addition to a 19-seat commuter configuration for airlines, a VIP cabin configuration is also offered; the cabin can also be customized as per each client's specifications. The Dornier 228 is the only aircraft of its class to be fitted with air conditioning as standard.

Dornier 228NG

More than 350 design changes are present between the Dornier 228 and the re-launched Dornier 228 NG. Amongst the principal changes is the adoption of Universal's UNS-1 glass cockpit, which means that standard aircraft are equipped to be flown under single-pilot instrument flight rules (IFR) in addition to visual flight rules (VFR); according to RUAG Aviation, the Dornier 228 NG is the first aircraft in its class to be certified with equivalent electronics. A total of four large displays are used in the cockpit, two primary flight displays and two multifunction displays, to present all key flight data. The navigation system includes VHF omnidirectional range (VOR), distance measuring equipment (DME), automatic direction finder (ADF), radar altimeter, Global Positioning System (GPS), air data computer, and a flight management system. A three-axis autopilot can be optionally incorporated, as can a weather radar and high frequency (HF) radio. While designed for two-pilot operation, the Dornier 228 can be flown by only one crewmember.

Additional changes include the Garrett TPE331-10 engines, which have been optimized to work with the redesigned five-bladed fibre-composite propellers now used by the type, which are more efficient, quick to start, and produces substantially less vibration and noise than the original metal four-bladed predecessor. Through its engines, the Dornier 228 NG has the longest time between overhaul (TBO) of any 19-seat aircraft, reportedly up to 7,000 hours. An engine-indicating and crew-alerting system (EICAS) is also present for safety purposes; additional optional safety equipment akin to much larger passenger aircraft, including airborne collision avoidance system (ACAS) and terrain awareness and warning system (TAWS), can be incorporated as well.
At  in clean config, the 228NG burns  of fuel per hour at a  cruise.

Operators

In July 2018, 57 aircraft were in airline service. Other operators include police, law enforcement, paramilitary operators and military operators.

By July 2018, the fleet accumulated over four million flight hours.

Accidents and incidents
The Dornier 228 has been involved in 54 aviation accidents and incidents including 41 hull losses.
Those resulted in 205 fatalities

Specifications (Dornier 228NG)

See also

References

External links

 
 
 
 
 

1980s German airliners
Dornier 228
STOL aircraft
High-wing aircraft
Twin-turboprop tractor aircraft
Aircraft first flown in 1981